YMS-107 was a wooden hulled yard minesweeper of the United States Navy built by the Burger Boat Co. in Manitowoc, Wisconsin. Her construction was completed on 3 August 1942, and she was commissioned the same day.

In September 1945, there was a collision between YMS-107 and the United States Army vessel FS-369. YMS-107 was removed from the Naval Register on 20 March 1946, and was transferred to the War Assets Administration in March 1948.

References

YMS-1-class minesweepers of the United States Navy
1942 ships
Ships built in Manitowoc, Wisconsin